Charles L. Munns, retired as a Vice Admiral in the United States Navy. Munns held several posts including Commander, United States Submarine Forces (COMNAVSUBFOR) and Commander, Submarine Force Atlantic (COMSUBLANT). Munns served as commander of the U.S. submarine force from 2004-2007.

Education
Munns graduated with distinction in 1973 from the United States Naval Academy with a bachelor of science degree, majoring in physics.

Munns received a master's of science in Computer Science from the University of Colorado in 1980. He attended MIT's Seminar XXI on Foreign Politics and International Relations from 1993-1994.

In May 2018, he received an  honorary doctorate of public service from the University of South Carolina.

In 2018, Munns was inducted into the West Des Moines Valley High School's Hall of Honor.

Military career

Munns served in the following positions:

 Division Officer, USS Seadragon (SSN-584), November 1974-May 1978
 Instructor, NROTC Unit University of Colorado, August 1978-December 1980
 Engineer, USS Ethan Allen (SSN-608), August 1981-March 1983
 Navigator, USS New York City (SSN-696), May 1983-October 1984
 Executive Officer, USS Florida (SSBN-728) (Blue), January 1985-January 1987
 Executive Assistant to the Deputy Chief of Staff, CINCPACFLT, February 1987-March 1989
 Commanding Officer, USS Richard B. Russell (SSN-687), April 1990-October 1992
 Commander, Submarine Development Squadron Twelve, July 1994-August 1995
 Fellow, CNO Strategic Studies Group, September 1995
 Chief of Staff, Commander Submarine Force U.S. Pacific Fleet, July 1996-May 1998 
 Deputy Chief of Staff for C4I, Resources, Requirements, and Assessments (N6N8) on the staff of the Commander, U.S. Pacific Fleet, April 1998-May 2000
 Commander Submarine Group Eight; Commander Submarines, Allied Naval Forces South; Commander, Submarine Force Sixth Fleet (CTF 69); and Commander, Fleet Ballistic Missile Submarine Force (CTF 164), June 2000
 Director, Navy Marine Corps Intranet (NMCI)
 Commander, United States Submarine Forces, 2004-2007

See also
United States Fleet Forces Command
Submarines in the United States Navy
Virginia-class submarine
List of submarine classes of the United States Navy

References

External links
Submarine Warfare Division website Information, history, and US Navy articles
Undersea Warfare magazine Undersea Warfare is the official magazine of the US Navy undersea warfare community.
Official US Navy submarine websites 
Official COMSUBLANT website

1950 births
Living people
United States Navy admirals
Recipients of the Navy Distinguished Service Medal
Recipients of the Legion of Merit
Military personnel from Minneapolis
United States Naval Academy alumni
University of Colorado Boulder alumni